Edidiong Ofinome Odiong (born 13 March 1997) is a Nigerian-born sprinter from Bahrain. She won the 200 m at the 2016 IAAF World U20 Championships and qualified in this  event for the 2016 Summer Olympics.

Early life and education 
Odiong was born in Calabar, Nigeria. She attended Wisdom Based Academics High School.

While at Florida State University Odiong majored in international affairs.

Athletic career 
Odiong won the girls’ 400m at the 2013 African Youth Athletics Championships (AYAC) in Warri, Nigeria.

Odioing competed for Nigeria at the 2014 IAAF World Junior Championships in Oregon, where she placed 6th in the 400m final and placed 5th along with her teammates in the 4x400m.

She competed at the 2018 Asian Games in Jakarta.

From 2020-2022 she competed for the Florida State Seminoles.

References

1997 births
Living people
Bahraini female sprinters
Nigerian emigrants to Bahrain
Naturalized citizens of Bahrain
Olympic athletes of Bahrain
Athletes (track and field) at the 2016 Summer Olympics
Athletes (track and field) at the 2018 Asian Games
World Athletics Championships athletes for Bahrain
Asian Games medalists in athletics (track and field)
Asian Games gold medalists for Bahrain
Asian Games silver medalists for Bahrain
Medalists at the 2018 Asian Games
Asian Games gold medalists in athletics (track and field)
Olympic female sprinters
Islamic Solidarity Games medalists in athletics